Sancharam is an Indian Malayalam-language travel documentary telecast on Safari TV. The program has been shot, edited and directed by Santhosh George Kulangara. It is being aired on 09:30 pm and 10 pm (IST) every weekday and re-telecasted the next day (weekdays only) four times. Originally aired on Asianet on Sundays, it has then been aired on Safari TV, which is owned by Santhosh George Kulangara. An internet edition of Sancharam is also available free of cost. It is said to be the first Internet television in Kerala.

List of countries travelled

Awards 

Sancharam has received many awards. Some of the awards include:
 Best TV serial award
 Vivekananda Awards
 Limca Book of Records, added in its 2007 edition
 Kerala's Film Critics Award: for the best Television program telecasted in 2005.
 Souparnikatheeram State Award: Television Award for the best director of a non-fictional program.
 All India RAPA Award-2004: award of 'best non-fiction television program' given away by Radio and TV Advertising Practitioners Association (RAPA)
 National Film Academy Award: program has been declared eligible for the award instituted by National Film Academy for the section 'Other than Fiction'
 Kerala Film Critics Association Award-2003
 All India Akshaya National Award-2003
 National Award: This is one of the awards given at National level in the Radio-Mini screen field. This program selected for the award from the TV programs of about 20 different languages.

Sources

Notes

References

External links
 

Malayalam-language television shows
Documentary web series
Asianet (TV channel) original programming
Indian television series